Marylebone Cricket Club (MCC) is a cricket club founded in 1787 and based since 1814 at Lord's Cricket Ground, which it owns, in St John's Wood, London. The club was formerly the governing body of cricket retaining considerable global influence.

In 1788, the MCC took responsibility for the laws of cricket, issuing a revised version that year. Changes to these Laws are now determined by the International Cricket Council (ICC), but the copyright is still owned by MCC. When the ICC was established in 1909, it was administered by the secretary of the MCC, and the president of MCC automatically assumed the chairmanship of ICC until 1989.

For much of the 20th century, commencing with the 1903–04 tour of Australia and ending with the 1976–77 tour of India, MCC organised international tours on behalf of the England cricket team for playing Test matches. On these tours, the England team played under the auspices of MCC in non-international matches. In 1993, its administrative and governance functions were transferred to the ICC and the Test and County Cricket Board (TCCB).

MCC teams are essentially ad hoc because they have never taken part in any formal competition, but have always held first-class status when playing against first-class opposition. By tradition, to mark the beginning of each English season, MCC plays the reigning county champions.

The present president of the club is Stephen Fry, who assumed the twelve-month office on 1 October 2022, replacing Clare Connor, the first woman to hold the post.

History and role 

The origin of MCC was as a gentlemen's club that had flourished through most of the 18th century, including, at least in part, an existence as the original London Cricket Club, which had played at the Artillery Ground through the middle years of the century. Many of its members became involved with the Hambledon Club through the 1770s and then, in the early 1780s, had returned to the London area where the White Conduit Club had begun in Islington. It is not known for certain when the White Conduit was founded but it seems to have been after 1780 and certainly by 1785. According to Sir Pelham Warner, it was formed in 1782 as an offshoot from a West End convivial club called the Je-ne-sais-quoi, some of whose members frequented the White Conduit House in Islington and played matches on the neighbouring White Conduit Fields, which had been a prominent venue for cricket in the 1720s. Arthur Haygarth said in Scores and Biographies that "the Marylebone Club was founded in 1787 from the White Conduit's members" but the date of the formation of the White Conduit "could not be found".

This gentlemen's club, which was multi-purpose, had a social meeting place at the Star and Garter on Pall Mall. It was the same club that was responsible for drafting the Laws of Cricket at various times, most notably in 1744 and 1774, and this lawgiving responsibility was soon to be vested in the MCC as the final repose of these cricketing gentlemen. When the White Conduit began, its leading lights were George Finch, 9th Earl of Winchilsea (1752–1826) and the Hon. Colonel Charles Lennox (1764–1819), later succeeding as the 4th Duke of Richmond. White Conduit was nominally an exclusive club that only "gentlemen" might play for, but the club did engage professionals and one of these was Thomas Lord, a man who was recognised for his business acumen (becoming a successful wine merchant) "as well as his bowling ability".

The new club might have continued except that White Conduit Fields was an open area allowing members of the public, including the rowdier elements, to watch the matches and to voice their opinions on the play and the players. The White Conduit gentlemen were not amused by such interruptions and decided to look for a more private venue of their own. Winchilsea and Lennox asked Lord to find a new ground and offered him a guarantee against any losses he may suffer in the venture. Lord took a lease from the Portman Estate on some land at Dorset Fields where Dorset Square is now sited; and the ground was prepared and opened in 1787. It was initially called the New Cricket Ground, perhaps because it was off what was then called "the New Road" in Marylebone, when the first known match was played there on 21 May but, by the end of July, it was known as Lord's. As it was in Marylebone, the White Conduit members who relocated to it soon decided to call themselves the "Mary-le-bone Club". The exact date of MCC's foundation is lost but seems to have been sometime in the late spring or the summer of 1787. On 10 & 11 July 1837, a South v North match was staged at Lord's to commemorate the MCC's Golden Jubilee. Warner described it as "a Grand Match to celebrate the Jubilee of the Club" and reproduced the full scorecard.

On 25 April 1787, the London Morning Herald newspaper carried a notice: "The Members of the Cricket Club are desired to meet at the Star and Garter, Pall Mall, on Mon., April 30. Dinner on table exactly at half past five o'clock. N.B. The favour of an answer is desired". The agenda is unknown but, only three weeks later on Saturday, 19 May, the Morning Herald advertised: "A grand match will be played on Monday, 21 May in the New Cricket Ground, the New Road, Mary-le-bone, between eleven Noblemen of the White Conduit Club and eleven Gentlemen of the County of Middlesex with two men given, for 500 guineas a side. The wickets to be pitched at ten o'clock, and the match to be played out". No post-match report has been found but, as G. B. Buckley said, it was "apparently the first match to be played on Lord's new ground".

A total of eight matches are known to have been played at Lord's in 1787, one of them a single wicket event. The only one which featured the Mary-le-bone Club took place on Monday, 30 July. It was advertised in The World on Friday, 27 July 1787: "On Monday, 30 July will be played (at Lord's) a match between 11 gentlemen of the Mary-le-bone Club and 11 gentlemen of the Islington Club". Buckley stated that "this is the earliest notice of the Marylebone Club". As with the inaugural match at Lord's, no post-match report of the inaugural MCC match has been found.

Grounds

There have been three Lord's grounds: the original on the Portman Estate and two on the Eyre Estate. All three sites lie to the west of Regent's Park. Thomas Lord leased the original ground, now referred to as Lord's Old Ground, from the Portman Estate in 1787 and MCC played there until 1810 when Lord, after objecting to a rent increase, decided on termination of the lease to lift his turf and move out. Over 200 matches are known to have been played there, mostly involving MCC and/or Middlesex. The Old Ground was on the site now occupied by Dorset Square which is east of Marylebone Station and west of Baker Street. To commemorate the association, a plaque was unveiled in Dorset Square on 9 May 2006 by Sir Andrew Strauss.

Lord had been aware some years before 1810 that the Portman Estate intended to let the site on building leases which would command the much higher rent of over £600 per annum. On 15 October 1808, he rented two fields in the North Bank area of the St John's Wood Estate, which belonged to Richard Eyre, a local landowner after whom Eyre's Tunnel on the Regent's Canal was named. Rental on the Eyre site was only £54 per annum for a term of eighty years and free of both land tax and tithe.

The new ground was ready for use in 1809 and so Lord had two grounds at his disposal for the 1809 and 1810 seasons. The North Bank ground was sub-let to St John's Wood Cricket Club which eventually merged with MCC. Lord officially took over his second ground on 8 May 1811 by re-laying there his turf from the Old Ground. He did this so that "the noblemen and gentlemen of the MCC should be able to play on the same footing as before". According to Warner, however, the relocation was unpopular with many MCC members and, as a result, the club played no matches there in either 1811 or 1812. This may have been so, but cricket generally was in decline at the time because of the Napoleonic Wars. The Association of Cricket Statisticians and Historians (the ACS) holds that "(from) 1810 to 1814 the game was all but dead", largely because of the war and "the very real threat of civil unrest in England". The second venue is now generally known as Lord's Middle Ground. In the three years that Lord controlled it, only six matches are known to have taken place there and just three of these (all in 1813) involved MCC. The Middle Ground's exact location is uncertain but it is understood to have been in North Bank at the north end of Lisson Grove and that the Regent's Canal has been cut through it. This means that it was partially on the canal route and somewhere in the area now bounded by Lisson Grove (the B507) to south-west, Lodge Road to north-west, Park Road (the A41) to north-east and the Regent's Canal to south-east.

Lord was forced to abandon the Middle Ground because of the canal construction. The decision on the route was made by Parliament in 1813. Lord, via his protégé Lord Frederick Beauclerk, approached the Eyre family who agreed to lease him another plot nearby in St John's Wood, but at an increased rent of £100 per annum. Lord accepted and again removed and relaid his turf in time for the start of the 1814 season. This third ground was the present Lord's, now home to MCC for over 200 years.

Laws of Cricket

MCC is the body responsible for, and remains the copyright holder of, the Laws of Cricket. Its Laws Sub-Committee is responsible for debating and drafting changes to the Laws, with the Main Committee then voting on any changes proposed.

Membership

MCC has 18,000 full members and 5,000 associate members. Members have voting rights and can use the Pavilion and other stands at Lord's Cricket Ground to attend all matches played there.

In order to join the waiting list of candidates for membership one must obtain the vote (of which each full member has one a year) of three members, and the additional sponsorship of a person on the List of MCC Sponsors (which consists of members of all MCC Sub-Committees; MCC Committee; MCC Out-Match Representatives; and the Current, Past and Designate President). As the demand for membership always outstrips supply each year, there continues to be a substantial waiting list for Full Ordinary Membership, currently around 27 years. There are, however, ways to lessen the time it takes to become a full member: one may qualify as a Playing Member, or Out-Match Member (although this carries none of the privileges of membership, apart from being able to play for the club).

In addition, membership rules allow a certain number of people each year to be elected ahead of their turn; beneficiaries have included Sir Mick Jagger and in 2018 the Prime Minister, Theresa, now Lady May. MCC also grants limited honorary membership to people who have had distinguished cricket careers. The club recognises achievement in women's cricket with, for example, Charlotte Edwards an inductee in the 2010s.

Controversies
The club's members refused to allow female membership up until 1998, with club ballots on the change unable to achieve the two-thirds majority amongst the membership required for implementation. The move to change was spearheaded by Rachael Heyhoe Flint who applied as "R Flint" to slip into the male-only application system. When Colin Ingleby-Mackenzie, a longstanding supporter of women's membership, took on the presidency of MCC in 1996 he led a two-year campaign to convince the membership to vote in favour of change. In September 1998 a 70% majority of members voted to allow female membership, so ending 212 years of male exclusivity, and 10 honorary life members were immediately admitted, including Baroness Heyhoe Flint. Until this time, The Queen, the club's patron, was the only woman (other than domestic staff) permitted to enter the Pavilion during play. In February 1999, five women were invited to join as playing members.

There was further controversy in 2005 when the club was criticised (including by a few of its own members) for siding with the England and Wales Cricket Board (ECB) over the latter's decision to award television rights for Test cricket to British Sky Broadcasting, thus removing Test cricket from terrestrial television. The then Secretary and Chief Executive of MCC, Roger Knight, represented the club on the board of the ECB and was party to this controversial and much criticised decision, prior to which Test cricket had been shown free to viewers on British television for more than half a century.

Another controversy was MCC's decision to allow members and other spectators to continue to bring limited amounts of alcoholic drinks into the ground at all matches. This decision challenged the ICC, which was attempting to implement a ban on this practice at all international matches around the world. MCC has opted to write to the ICC on an annual basis to seek permission for members and spectators to import alcohol into Lord's.

The Secretary & Chief Executive of the club has a place on the administrative board of the England and Wales Cricket Board and it is reported that Keith Bradshaw (Secretary & Chief Executive 2006–11) may have influenced the removal from office of England Coach Duncan Fletcher in April 2007.

In 2012, MCC made headlines over a controversial redevelopment plan, Vision for Lord's, that would have increased capacity but included construction of residential flats on some of the MCC site. Internal strife over the process of making a decision on the proposal led to the resignation of former Prime Minister Sir John Major from the Main Committee.

In 2022, Guy Lavender, Secretary & Chief Executive of MCC, announced that the annual one-day Oxford v Cambridge and Eton v Harrow matches, both of which have been played at Lord's since the early 19th century, would no longer be held at the ground, so as to make room in the fixture list for the finals of competitions for all universities and schools in pursuit of greater diversity. However, following opposition from a majority of its membership, the club decided that the matches would continue to be held at Lord's until at least 2023 to allow time for further consultation. In March 2023 it was announced that the fixtures would continue to be played at Lord's until at least 2027, following which there would be a review and a possible vote in 2028 on whether the matches should remain at Lord's.

Matches
MCC men's and women's teams play domestic matches throughout the spring and summer against teams from universities, schools, the Armed Forces and invitational teams such as the Duchess of Rutland's XI. The men's team tour internationally four times per year, and the women's team tour every other year.

Coaching

MCC has long had a deep involvement in coaching cricket. The club's head coach leads an extensive operation involving the running of an indoor-cricket school and a team of coaches in England and around the world. The club has traditionally produced a coaching manual, the MCC Cricket Coaching Book, a bible for cricket skills, and runs training programmes for young cricketers, including many at its Lord's Indoor Centre. MCC continues to tour around England, playing matches against various state and private schools. This tradition has been followed since the 19th century. The club has other sporting interests with both a real tennis and a squash court on site at Lord's, and golf, chess, bridge and backgammon societies.

Club colours
From the beginning of the 20th century, MCC organised the England cricket team and, outside Test matches, the touring England team officially played as "MCC" up to and including the 1976/77 tour of India. The England touring team wore the distinctive red and yellow stripes of the Marylebone Cricket Club as their colours for the last time on the tour to New Zealand in 1996/97.

The true provenance of MCC's colours is (and probably will remain) unsubstantiated, but its players often turned out sporting sky blue (qv. Eton or Cambridge) until well into the 19th century. The club eventually settled on the now well-recognised colours of scarlet and gold, or in other parlance "egg and bacon". One purported theory is that MCC adopted these colours from J&W Nicholson & Co's gin after the company's chairman, MCC benefactor William Nicholson (1825–1909), secured the club's position at Lord's with a loan. A more likely theory, which chimes with the club's origins, is that MCC borrowed its colours from the livery colours (racing) of a founding patron, the Duke of Richmond, Lennox and Gordon, of Goodwood-fame.

Image
Often viewed as too traditional (ie. "establishment"), the club continues its modernising mission before the public and media, partly because it remains a citadel for tradition in a fast-changing landscape and partly because it has made a concerted move towards image-improvement.  "It would be overstating things to claim that the MCC has come full circle," admitted Andrew Miller at the beginning of October 2008, "but at a time of massive upheaval in the world game, the... NW8's colours cease to represent everything that is wrong with cricket, and instead have become a touchstone for those whose greatest fear is the erosion of the game's traditional values."

Legal status
Before 2013 the MCC was a private members' club (meaning that it had the status of an unincorporated association); this status had several limitations. Since an unincorporated association is not a legal entity, it could not own property (such as Lord's Cricket Ground itself) in its own name. It could not sue anybody, or indeed be sued (any legal action had to be taken against the Secretary & Chief Executive personally). In the event that a claim was successful, the committee and even the members themselves would have had to fund any financial shortfall. The club therefore called a Special General Meeting in June 2012 to consider petitioning The Queen in Council to incorporate the club by Royal Charter. The Royal Charter removed many of the barriers and simplified the administration of the club.

Resulting from the petition, in December 2012 the club was granted a Royal Charter, two previous attempts having been unsuccessful. As a result, the club became an incorporated association and is now able to hold assets, including the Lord's Cricket Ground, in its own name instead of via a custodian trustee. It also meant that the individual members, as the club's owners, no longer have a potential liability should the club ever get into serious financial trouble.

MCC Universities
From 2005 the MCC funded six university cricket academies known as the MCC Universities (MCCUs), which had previously been funded (from 2000) by the England and Wales Cricket Board (ECB). (Prior to 2010 they were known as the University Centres of Cricketing Excellence, or UCCEs.) These were based at Cambridge, Cardiff, Durham, Leeds/Bradford, Loughborough and Oxford, and incorporated a total of thirteen universities. From 2012 all six MCCUs held first-class status. Each MCCU played a trio of matches against professional county sides at the beginning of each season, with first-class status conferred on the first two of these matches. In 2018, the MCC and ECB announced that the ECB would be resuming responsibility for funding the university centres from 2020 and would run a tender process for new cities to join the scheme. The change was also said to be likely to result in more T20 cricket in the programme. Despite the ECB having resumed funding, the university teams continue to use the MCC University names.

Officers of the club
Presidents serve a twelve-month term and cannot normally serve two terms in succession. Notable exceptions occurred during World War I and World War II. In 1914, Lord Hawke was appointed president and was asked to remain in the post till the end of the Great War. As a result, Hawke was MCC President for five years from 1914 to 1918 inclusive and was succeeded in 1919 by the former Hampshire slow left-arm bowler Henry Forster, who shortly afterwards was raised to the peerage as Lord Forster. Throughout the war, Lord's was used for military purposes, including training and recreation. Problems frequently arose but, in Wisden's view, Hawke was "the greatest help in giving wise counsel towards their solution".

Hawke's tenure was exceeded by that of Stanley Christopherson who was appointed in 1939 and remained in situ for seven years until 1945 before being succeeded by General Sir Ronald Adam.

In his Barclays World of Cricket essay about the MCC Presidency, E. W. Swanton stated that "there is no pretence of democracy about it" commenting on how few were untitled up to the Second World War. As he observed, membership of the aristocracy was a more important factor than any cricketing prowess. This observation did indeed reflect societal change, although the Duke of Edinburgh, the Earl of Home, Lord Cowdrey and Sir Tim Rice all became President of MCC in the latter half of the 20th century. In the 21st century there have been MCC Presidents who as players were wholly professional: Tom Graveney, Derek Underwood, Mike Gatting and Matthew Fleming. The 2018–19 President, Anthony Wreford, nominated Kumar Sangakkara as his successor in May 2019; Sangakkara became MCC's first non-British President.

Each President is required to nominate their successor at the Annual General Meeting (AGM) which takes place during his/her term of office. The club chairman and the treasurer serve a three-year term. Both are appointed by the committee (but subject to approval of the voting members). Both can serve terms in succession. The secretary and chief executive (a joint role) is the senior employee of the club and is appointed solely by the MCC committee.

The committee consists of the above officers plus the chairmen of any other committees that may exist at the time of any meeting plus twelve elected members. Elected committee members are appointed for a three-year term. An elected committee member cannot be re-elected upon retirement unless there is a gap of at least one year between terms of office.

Secretaries
MCC first engaged a Club Secretary in 1822. The title was changed in 2000, during Roger Knight's tenure, to Secretary and Chief Executive. Holders of office have been:

 Benjamin Aislabie (1822–1842)
 Roger Kynaston (1842–1858)
 Alfred Baillie (1858–1863)
 Robert Allan Fitzgerald (1863–1876)
 Henry Perkins (1876–1898)
 Francis Lacey (1898–1926)
 William Findlay (1926–1936)
 Rowan Rait Kerr (1936–1952)
 Ronnie Aird (1952–1962)
 Billy Griffith (1962–1974)
 J. A. Bailey (1974–1987)
 John Robin Stephenson (1987–1994)
 Roger Knight (1994–2006)
 Keith Bradshaw (2006–2011)
 Derek Brewer (2011–2017)
 Guy Lavender (2017–)

References

Bibliography

Further reading
 Green, Stephen (2003), Lord's, Cathedral of Cricket The History Press Ltd.
 Jonathan Rice, Presidents of MCC, Methuen Publishing, 2006.

External links

 
 Cricinfo MCC homepage with pictures and results

 
Cricket administration
Sport in the City of Westminster
Organisations based in London with royal patronage
Sports clubs established in 1787
1787 establishments in England
English cricket teams in the 18th century
English cricket in the 19th century
English first-class cricket teams
English club cricket teams
Cricket teams in London
Gentlemen's clubs in London
City of Westminster-related lists